Word-initial ff means the digraph  at the beginning of a word, which is an anomalous feature, in lower case, of a few proper names in English. In other words, which is "Latin small ligature ff", a stylistic ligature from Unicode, available now in some Latin script fonts, represented in certain traditional handwriting styles the upper case .

In Spanish orthography, on the other hand, word-initial  had a phonetic meaning, over a period of some centuries.

In English

Mark Antony Lower in his Patronymica Brittanica (1860) called this spelling an affectation. He stated that it originated in "a foolish mistake concerning the ff of old manuscripts, which is no duplication, but simply a capital f." Later in the 19th century the palaeographer Edward Maunde Thompson wrote from the British Museum:

The English legal handwriting of the Middle Ages has no capital F. A double f (ff) was used to represent the capital letter. In transcribing, I should write F, not ff; e. g. Fiske, not ffiske. 

The replacement of manuscript word-initial ff by F is now a scholarly convention.

Usage in names such as Charles ffoulkes and Richard ffrench-Constant persists. The initial Ff in Welsh spelling of imported proper names has been attributed to the standing of ff as part of normal Welsh orthography. Citing Trevor Davenport-Ffoulkes, H. L. Mencken in a supplement to The American Language wrote that "The initial Ff is sometimes written ff, but this is an error." David Crystal cites both Welsh-derived proper names, such as Ffion (where single F would sound like English v in Welsh phonetics), and English-derived names such as Ffoulkes.

In Spanish
It has been argued that word-initial ff was used in written Spanish around 1500, to indicate the phonetic difference between an f-sound and an aspirated h. It can be observed to have come in strongly for Spanish spelling during the 13th century. The actual pronunciation was dynamic, with the aspiration being dropped from the time when Madrid became the Spanish capital (1561). The word-initial ff spelling convention lagged behind current phonetics, providing a way of tracking pronunciations after they had become obsolete.

Notes

Latin-script orthographies